McCarthy Catholic College may refer to:

McCarthy Catholic College, Emu Plains, New South Wales, Australia
McCarthy Catholic College, Tamworth, New South Wales, Australia